In the Key of Charles was a Canadian radio program, which aired on CBC Radio One and CBC Radio 2. Hosted by musician Gregory Charles, the program aired a variety of musical selections chosen by Charles to reflect a particular theme each week.

On March 26, 2009 the CBC announced that the program would be cancelled.

External links
 In the Key of Charles

CBC Radio One programs
CBC Music programs
Canadian music radio programs